Rivalen Der Rennbahn is a German television series that aired in 1989, with a total of eleven episodes. It was directed by Stefan Bartmann.

Plot
Successful jockey Christian Adler mysteriously falls off his horse and is injured so badly that he has to end his active career. Countess Louise Hayn-Hohenstein tries to use his knowledge and experience and offers Christian the management of her stable, together with the previous director Wolf Kremer. Business goes well initially, especially when the well-known horse owner Hans-Otto Gruber gives the stable four horses for training. Personal histories clash, however, and a brutal game of intrigue in the field of equestrian sports begins.

Cast and characters
 Thomas Fritsch as Christian Adler
 Jutta Speidel as Monika Adler
 Manfred Zapatka as Hans-Otto Gruber
 Maja Maranow as Sylvia Gruber
 Margot Hielscher as Louise Gräfin Hayn-Hohenstein
 Hellmut Lange as Wolf Kremer
 Ilse Werner as Tante Ella
 Hans Clarin as Rolf Lesch
 Radost Bokel as Margit Franke
 Santiago Ziesmer as Ludger
 Zacharias Preen as Klaus
 Tilly Lauenstein as Rosalinde von Rödermark
 Ferdy Mayne as Emanuel von Rödermark
 Thekla Carola Wied as Thea Waasing
 Winfried Glatzeder as Georg Waasing
 Ursula Karven as Jeannette

Soundtrack
 Countdown G.T.O. – Rivalen der Rennbahn
 Nino de Angelo – Samuraj
 Les McKeown – It's a Game (Long Version)
 Marianne Rosenberg – I Need Your Love Tonight
 Countdown G.T.O – Magic Race (Long Version)
 Ricky Shayne – Once I'm Gonna Stay Forever
 Blue System – Love Suite
 Ann Turner – I'm Your Lady
 Nino de Angelo – Don't Kill It Carol
 Countdown G.T.O. – Samuraj (Instrumental)
 Countdown G.T.O. – Rivalen der Rennbahn – Reprise

References

External links
 
 

German drama television series
1989 German television series debuts
1989 German television series endings
Television series about horses
Horse racing mass media
German-language television shows
ZDF original programming